The Himachal Pradesh women's football team is an Indian women's football team representing Himachal Pradesh in the Senior Women's National Football Championship. Their best performance at the Senior Women's National Football Championship was the quarter-final appearance at the 2019–20 edition.

Himachal Pradesh's junior team were the champions of the National Junior Girls' Football tournament 2019–20 held at Kolhapur.

Honours
 Junior Girl's National Football Championship
 Winners (1): 2019–20

References

Women's football teams in India
Football in Himachal Pradesh